Mitsuru Motoi (born 29 August 1941) is a Japanese former professional tennis player.

Born in Yao City, Motoi is a graduate of Kwansei Gakuin University and won a singles bronze medal for Japan at the 1963 Summer Universiade. He was beaten in five sets by Koji Watanabe in the singles final of the 1964 All-Japan championships. In 1965 he played in a Davis Cup tie for the only time, against South Korea in Seoul, winning both his singles and doubles rubber. In 1973 he won the All-Japan championships in mixed doubles.

Motoi previously served as manager of the national team for the Davis Cup, Federation Cup and Seoul Olympics.

See also
List of Japan Davis Cup team representatives

References

External links
 
 
 

1941 births
Living people
Japanese male tennis players
People from Yao, Osaka
Sportspeople from Osaka Prefecture
Kwansei Gakuin University alumni
Universiade medalists in tennis
Universiade silver medalists for Japan
Universiade bronze medalists for Japan
Medalists at the 1961 Summer Universiade
Medalists at the 1963 Summer Universiade